Sant'Alessio Siculo (Sicilian: Sant'Alessiu Sìculu) is a comune (municipality) in the Metropolitan City of Messina in the Italian region Sicily, located about  east of Palermo and about  southwest of Messina.

Its main attraction is a castle built by the Byzantine emperor Alexios I Comnenos in his war against the Normans and the Arabs, who also held it.

References

Cities and towns in Sicily
Castles in Italy